Carol A. Doherty is an American educator and politician who is also the Member of Massachusetts House of Representatives from the 3rd Bristol district. She was elected on June 2, 2020, in a special election against Republican Kelly Dooner to replace former Representative Shaunna O'Connell, who resigned to become Mayor of Taunton in January. She also serves on the Taunton School Committee and Downtown Taunton Foundation Board.

See also
 2019–2020 Massachusetts legislature
 2021–2022 Massachusetts legislature

References

Educators from Massachusetts
American women educators
Democratic Party members of the Massachusetts House of Representatives
Living people
Year of birth missing (living people)
Place of birth missing (living people)
Politicians from Taunton, Massachusetts
21st-century American politicians
21st-century American women